Louise Crawford (born 1978 in Queensland, Australia) is an Australian film and television actress, who is a Councillor and former Mayor of the City of Port Phillip. Crawford has appeared in many Australian soaps and dramas, including a role as Sgt. Karen Hatzic in primetime drama series City Homicide.

Political career
Crawford is a member of the Victorian branch of the Australian Labor Party. 

Crawford is an activist for climate change action and trained with Al Gore in The Climate Reality Project. She was the unsuccessful Labor candidate for the seat of Brighton for the 2014 Victorian state election. In 2016, Crawford was elected as a Councillor of the City of Port Phillip, Canal Ward. On 29 Nov 2018 Cr Crawford was elected Deputy Mayor of that council. She also ran for the Australian Senate in the 2019 Australian federal election but was unsuccessful. 

Crawford was re-elected as a Councillor for Port Phillip in October 2020, and served as Mayor from 2020 to 2021. Under her leadership the Council faced significant challenges resulting from the COVID-19 pandemic.

Acting and writing career
Crawford first came to notice as "Shelley" Radcliffe in the 1995 Network Ten soap opera Echo Point. In 1996, she temporarily stood in for actress Tempany Deckert in the role of Selina Roberts on Home and Away, while Deckert recovered from illness. In 1998–99, Crawford appeared in Breakers, a short-lived soap opera series which aired on Network Ten, as Lucy Hill. She also appeared on Neighbours as Abby Stafford in 2007 and as Detective Ellen Crabb in 2013, reprising the role again in 2016.

She also appeared in Forget The Rules, a cross-platform "dramedy" series which appeared on Foxtel's Channel V, but could also be watched on the Internet and on mobile phones. and hosted the "reality" series Scream Test. Additionally, she appeared as a regular panellist on Beauty and the Beast, and has dabbled as a scriptwriter, writing episodes of Breakers and Home and Away.

Filmography

Writer

References

External links

Australian television actresses
Australian film actresses
Queensland University of Technology alumni
Place of birth missing (living people)
Living people
Politicians from Melbourne
1978 births
Mayors of places in Victoria (Australia)
Australian Labor Party politicians
Victoria (Australia) local councillors